Gara is both a surname and a given name. Notable people with the name include:

As surname
 Josh "Gara" Garland (born 1998), Canadian Bodybuilder
Andy Gara (born 1878), Irish footballer
Anita Gara (born 1983), Hungarian chess grandmaster
Dave Gara, drummer for the band Skid Row
Jeremy Gara (born 1978), Canadian drummer
Józef Gara (1929–2013), Polish miner and poet
Les Gara (born 1963), member of the Alaska House of Representatives
Ticia Gara (born 1984), Hungarian chess grandmaster

As given name
Gara Garayev (1918–1982), Azerbaijani composer
Gara Garayev (footballer) (born 1992), Azerbaijani football defender
 Gara Takashima, Japanese voice actress

Fictional characters
 Gaara, a character from the manga and anime series Naruto
 Gara, a character from the manga and anime series Dr. Slump.